The 2010 FIG World Cup circuit in Rhythmic Gymnastics includes six category A events and two category B events. With stopovers in North America and Europe, the competitions took place on January 30–31 in Montreal (CAN), March 6–7 in Debrecem (HUN), March 11–14 in Portimão (POR), March 26–28 in Kalamata (GRE), April 3–4 in Saint Petersburg (RUS), May 7–9 in Corbeil-Essonnes (FRA), May 21–23 in Minsk (BLR) and August 27–29 in Pesaro (ITA). Two events were open only to individual athletes (Montreal and Corbeil-Essonnes), while six were open to both individual athletes and groups. In all of the events, all-around competitions served as qualifications for the finals by apparatus. The world ranking points collected by the competitors at their best four World Cup events added up to a total, and the top scorers in each event were crowned winners of the overall series at the final event in Pesaro, Italy.

Formats

Medal winners

All-around

Individual

Group all-around

Apparatus

Rope

Hoop

Ball

Ribbon

5 hoops

2 ropes and 3 ribbons

Overall medal table

See also
 2010 FIG Artistic Gymnastics World Cup series

References

Rhythmic Gymnastics World Cup
2010 in gymnastics